Filippo Giannetti or Giannetto (1630 – 1702) was an Italian painter of Naples and Sicily.

Biography
He was born in Savoca, near Messina. He was known as Giordano de' paesisti ("the Giordano of landscape painters") for his ability to produce prolific and rapid landscapes. He initially trained with Jacopo Caro, and later with Abraham Casembrot. His wife, Flavia, was the daughter of  Giovanni Battista Durand Borgognone, a pupil of Domenichino. Flavia was known for portrait painting.

References

1630 births
1702 deaths
17th-century Italian painters
Italian male painters
Painters from Sicily
Italian landscape painters